Fadika Sarra Sako is an Ivorian politician. She studied at the Kybourg School in Geneva, Switzerland. Between 2011 and 2016, Sako was a member of parliament for the Rally of the Republicans. She was elected as Vice-President of the National Assembly in 2012 and held the position until 2016. In addition to working as a politician, in 2004, she founded a non-governmental organization aimed at alleviating poverty in the Bafing Region.  She holds the National Order of the Ivory Coast.

References 

1946 births
Rally of the Republicans politicians
Ivorian women in politics
Living people